Joseph Szostak (born 13 August 1943) is a French rower. He competed in the men's coxed pair event at the 1968 Summer Olympics.

References

1943 births
Living people
French male rowers
Olympic rowers of France
Rowers at the 1968 Summer Olympics
Sportspeople from Rhône (department)